The Mugali are a remote Tibetan Buddhist tribe in Nepal who speak the main dialect of the Mugom language.  There have been attempts to create public health materials for them that take into account their culture.

Sources
short page on health initiative with the Mugali

Ethnic groups in Nepal